Fabiano Medina da Silva (born 18 January 1982 in Ribeirão Preto), simply known as Fabiano, is a former Brazilian footballer who currently last played for Calcio Padova.

Career
Fabiano started his career at Vitória. he then signed by Atalanta and spent time in their youth team. He then played for some Serie C1 clubs, before signed by Lecce, on 30 August 2007 in join-ownership bid. He soon gained a place in the starting eleven.

External links
 AIC
 CBF

1982 births
Living people
Brazilian footballers
Brazilian expatriate footballers
Serie A players
Serie B players
Serie C players
Esporte Clube Vitória players
Atalanta B.C. players
S.S.D. Lucchese 1905 players
A.C. Monza players
Spezia Calcio players
Virtus Bergamo Alzano Seriate 1909 players
U.S. Lecce players
Shandong Taishan F.C. players
Calcio Padova players
Chinese Super League players
Expatriate footballers in Italy
Expatriate footballers in China
Association football midfielders
People from Ribeirão Preto
Brazilian expatriate sportspeople in China
Footballers from São Paulo (state)